Tsopk Shahunyats was a region in the Sophene region of ancient Greater Armenia c. 400–800, in the Armenia Sophene or Sophanene.

See also
List of regions of old Armenia

Early medieval Armenian regions